Florida Friebus (October 10, 1909  – May 27, 1988) was an American writer and actress of stage, film, and television. Friebus's best-known roles were Winifred "Winnie" Gillis, the sympathetic mother of Dwayne Hickman's character Dobie Gillis on The Many Loves of Dobie Gillis, and Mrs. Lillian Bakerman on The Bob Newhart Show.

Early years
Born in Auburndale, Massachusetts to Theodore Friebus and Beatrice Flagg Mosier, Friebus hailed from an East Coast theatrical family that included her father, a leading stage actor with Boston's Castle Square Players in the early 1900s and a minor silent-film actor, and her maternal grandmother, Georgine Flagg, who scandalized her own family in the late 19th century by venturing onstage as a player with Augustin Daly's stock company in Manhattan.

Friebus was known to make it clear to curious people that she was named after her mother's favorite aunt — not after the state of Florida. Her paternal grandmother was named Florida as well.

Personal life
Friebus married actor Richard Waring, in 1934. They had one child who died in infancy. The couple divorced in 1952. Friebus never remarried.

Career
Friebus first acted professionally in 1929 in New York City, appearing in The Cradle Song with the Civic Repertory Theater.

She appeared on television in such programs as The Ford Theatre Hour, Perry Mason, Bachelor Father, Father Knows Best, The Rookies, Peyton Place, Ironside, Gunsmoke, Sanford and Son, Ben Casey, The Doris Day Show, The Mary Tyler Moore Show, Room 222, The Partridge Family, Chico and the Man, Barnaby Jones, Alice, and Rhoda.

She also read stories to children on Look and Listen on KNXT in Los Angeles, California.

As a writer, Friebus collaborated with Eva Le Gallienne to dramatize Alice in Wonderland. The play was presented on Broadway and later on the Hallmark Hall of Fame on television.

Actors' Equity
Friebus spent more than 16 years on the board of Actors' Equity Association. She was presented the Phil Loeb Award "for extraordinary service to her profession."

Death
Friebus died of cancer in 1988 in Laguna Niguel, California, aged 78.

Papers
Friebus' papers are housed at the New York Public Library.

Filmography

Notes

References

External links

 
 
 

1909 births
1988 deaths
Actors from Newton, Massachusetts
20th-century American actresses
Actresses from Boston
Writers from Newton, Massachusetts
American film actresses
American stage actresses
American television actresses
Screenwriters from Massachusetts
Deaths from cancer in California
20th-century American singers
20th-century American screenwriters